Neuanlage is a hamlet in the Canadian province of Saskatchewan.

Demographics 

References 

Designated places in Saskatchewan
Organized hamlets in Saskatchewan
Rosthern No. 403, Saskatchewan
Division No. 15, Saskatchewan